The Chunyan Awards is a biannual event in Beijing, China, hosted by the Beijing Film and Television Association, a subsidiary of the Beijing Municipal Bureau of Press, Print, Radio, Film and Television. Recipients are recognized for their "exceptional achievement in Chinese film and/or television". The event has been held since 1991.
Originally, there are only television categories of the event. Since 2010, film categories have added.

Chunyan Film Award

Chunyan Television Award

See also

 List of Asian television awards

References

External links 
 IMDB Summary for the Chunyan Awards

Chinese film awards
Chinese television awards
Awards established in 1991
Recurring events established in 1991
Biennial events
1991 establishments in China
Events in Beijing